Spout Springs is a Census-designated place in Johnsonville Township of Harnett County, North Carolina, United  States. It was first listed as a CDP in the 2020 census with a population of 11,040.

It is a part of the Dunn Micropolitan Area, which is also a part of the greater Raleigh–Durham–Cary Combined Statistical Area (CSA) as defined by the United States Census Bureau.

Spout Springs formerly produced lumber and naval stores .

The area population has increased greatly in the 21st century due to the expansion of nearby Ft. Bragg.

Demographics

2020 census

Note: the US Census treats Hispanic/Latino as an ethnic category. This table excludes Latinos from the racial categories and assigns them to a separate category. Hispanics/Latinos can be of any race.

References

 

Census-designated places in Harnett County, North Carolina
Census-designated places in North Carolina
Unincorporated communities in Harnett County, North Carolina
Unincorporated communities in North Carolina